Agrestes was, according to the 13th-century Arthurian Vulgate Cycle, a pagan king of Camelot in the time of Joseph of Arimathea. Though the Lancelot section of the cycle has him converted by Joseph himself, the Estoire del Saint Graal section, written after the Vulgate Lancelot as a prequel, states that Joseph's son Josephus converted him. He persecuted those of his people who converted to Christianity under Josephus' influence:

References

Sources
 

Arthurian characters
Fictional kings
Fictional suicides
Pagans